Schauffler is a surname. Notable people with the surname include:

Robert Haven Schauffler (1879–1964), American writer, cellist, athlete, and war hero
Rudolf Schauffler (1889-1968) German scientist
William Gottlieb Schauffler (1798–1883), German missionary

German-language surnames